Quba District may refer to:

 Quba District (Azerbaijan)
 Quba District (Libya)

District name disambiguation pages